Doe Deer is a song from Toronto-based band, Crystal Castles, released on their second self-titled album, Crystal Castles. The release was limited to 500 copies on 12" vinyl. The EP was a special release for UK's record store day. Prior to the release, Doe Deer was played on UK's Radio 1, and rips began to circulate around the internet. The 12" gained special attention because three unreleased tracks from 2004 were featured as B-sides to the lead track. The song was featured in the episode "Nick" of Season 5 of Skins.

Composition
Doe Deer was written by Ethan Kath, with additional recording from Matthew Wagner.
The official lyrics for the song are stated as being the word "deathray" repeated numerous times.
The vocals are, in fact, sampled from one of their earlier songs from 2004, "Insectica", which was given its official release on the Doe Deer EP. Around the 0:53 mark of the song Insectica the word "deathray" is audibly being sung by Alice Glass. This is exactly the same as the repeated version throughout Doe Deer.

Accolades

Track listing
"Doe Deer" – 1:37
"Seed" (2004 Version) – 1:43
"Insectica" (2004 Version) – 1:48
"Mother Knows Best" (2004 Version) – 2:01

References

2006 EPs
Crystal Castles (band) albums